is a Japanese voice actress and singer from Kanagawa Prefecture who is affiliated with Office Anemone. She is the daughter of voice actress Kikuko Inoue. She debuted as a singer in 2015, and she began her voice acting career in 2016, appearing as minor characters in the anime series Danganronpa 3: The End of Hope's Peak High School and Maho Girls PreCure!. She released her first mini-album First Flight in 2016, and her first single "Sparkling Chinatown" in 2017.

Career
Inoue was born in Kanagawa Prefecture on February 9, 1998. She is the daughter of voice actress Kikuko Inoue.

In 2015, Inoue began her career in entertainment as a singer, performing the song  under the mononym Honoka; the song was used in the video game Taiko no Tatsujin. She then made her voice acting debut in 2016 after becoming affiliated with Office Anemone, the same agency as her mother. Her first voice acting roles were in the anime series Danganronpa 3: The End of Hope's Peak High School and Maho Girls PreCure!.

In 2016, Inoue provided the voice for the Live action Anime Japanese film Shimajiro in Bookland.

In 2017, Inoue and her mother appeared as a daughter and mother in the original net animation Pokémon Generations. She also appeared in the anime series WorldEnd as Phyracorlybia Dorio and In Another World With My Smartphone as Alma. That same year, she was cast as the character Ruby Azumi in the mobile game Between the Sky and Sea. She released her first single "Sparkling Chinatown" on June 28, 2017.

In 2018, Inoue played the role of Sakura Uzuki in the anime series Pazudora. She will also reprise the role of Ruby for the anime series adaptation of Between the Sky and Sea.

In 2021, it was announced that Inoue would be the voice actress for Nanami Asari in The Idolmaster franchise, who appears in two mobile games The Idolmaster Cinderella Girls and The Idolmaster Cinderella Girls: Starlight Stage. This role involves publishing CDs under the character's name as well as appearing in concerts.

Filmography

Television animation

Theatrical animation

Video games

Dubbing
The 100, Madi Griffin (Lola Flanery)
Annabelle: Creation, Janice (Talitha Bateman)
Don't Breathe 2, Phoenix (Madelyn Grace)
Dora and the Lost City of Gold, Dora (Isabela Moner)
Resident Evil: Welcome to Raccoon City, Sherry Birkin (Holly de Barros)

References

External links
Official agency profile 

 

1998 births
Living people
Japanese women pop singers
Japanese video game actresses
Japanese voice actresses
Voice actresses from Kanagawa Prefecture
21st-century Japanese singers
21st-century Japanese women singers